Bono may refer to places in the U.S. state of Indiana:
Bono, Lawrence County, Indiana
Bono Township, Lawrence County, Indiana
Bono, Vermillion County, Indiana